Blue Velvet is an album by saxophonist Houston Person which was recorded in 2001 and released on the HighNote label.

Reception

In his review on Allmusic, Stewart Mason states " It's impossible to fault any of Houston Person's albums from this period, as the tenor saxophonist remains a sublimely gifted soloist with a gorgeous, well-rounded tone and a smartly melodic soloing sense ... This is undeniably fine music, but there's so little to differentiate this album from so many others that Houston Person has done that finally, it's primarily of interest either to die-hard fans or those who have near heard any albums from this period in Person's career. Honestly, if you've heard one, you've heard them all".
The Penguin Guide to Jazz Recordings describes Blue Velvet as one of Person’s best albums.

Track listing 
 "Everything I Have Is Yours" (Burton Lane, Harold Adamson) – 5:33
 "Wonder Why" (Nicholas Brodszky, Sammy Cahn) – 4:04
 "Blame It on My Youth" (Oscar Levant, Edward Heyman) – 6:48
 "Too Late Now" (Lane, Alan Jay Lerner) – 7:43
 "There's No You" (Hal Hopper, Tom Adair) – 5:52
 "Be My Love" (Brodszky, Cahn) – 6:04
 "I Want to Talk About You" (Billy Eckstine) – 4:14
 "I Hadn't Anyone Till You" (Ray Noble) – 5:09
 "Blue Velvet" (Bernie Wayne, Lee Morris) – 6:33

Personnel 
Houston Person – tenor saxophone
Richard Wyands – piano
Ray Drummond – bass
Grady Tate – drums

References 

Houston Person albums
2001 albums
HighNote Records albums
Albums recorded at Van Gelder Studio